Michael Keith Ricken (born 1970) is an Irish Gaelic football coach and former player. He has experience as a manager at club and inter-county levels.

Ricken was announced as manager of the senior Cork county team for the 2022 season but was forced to step down due to health problems midway through, with John Cleary taking over on an interim basis.

Management career
Ricken's playing career included time as a goalkeeper with the St. Vincent's club on the northside of Cork city. It was with his home club that he first moved into coaching, guiding the St. Vincent's intermediate team to Premier Intermediate Championship successes in 2006 and again in 2012. During that time he also guided the Cork Institute of Technology to their inaugural Sigerson Cup title. Ricken was appointed manager of the Cork under-20 football team in January 2019 and guided the team to win the 2019 All-Ireland Under-20 Football Championship in his first season in charge. He also secured two Munster U20 Championships.

Ricken was ratified as manager of the senior Cork county team for the 2022 season.

He stood aside as Cork senior manager for the remainder of the season in April 2022, due to health problems. John Cleary replaced him.

Honours
Cork Institute of Technology
Sigerson Cup: 2009

St. Vincent's
Cork Premier Intermediate Football Championship: 2006, 2012

Cork
All-Ireland Under-20 Football Championship: 2019
Munster Under-20 Football Championship: 2019, 2021

References

1970 births
Living people
Gaelic football coaches
Gaelic football goalkeepers
Gaelic football managers
Gaelic football selectors
Hurling managers
St Vincent's (Cork) Gaelic footballers